Barbe-bleue may refer to:

Barbe-bleue (opera), opéra bouffe in three acts by Jacques Offenbach 
Barbe-bleue, a 1943 radio opera by Jacques Ibert
Barbe-bleue (film), silent French crime film

See also
 Bluebeard (disambiguation)